Lainson is a surname. Notable people with the surname include:

Harvey Lainson ( 1935–2005), Canadian minister, politician, and businessman
Ralph Lainson (1927–2015), British parasitologist
Thomas Lainson (1825–1898), British architect

English-language surnames